The 2014 IIHF World Women's U18 Championships was the seventh IIHF U18 Women's World Championship. Organized by the International Ice Hockey Federation (IIHF), the ice hockey tournament was played at two rinks of the Jégpalota (called 'Icecenter' in IIHF documents) in Budapest, Hungary, from 23 to 30 March 2014.

Top Division

Preliminary round

Group A

Group B

Relegation round
The teams played a best-of-three series.

 are relegated to the 2015 Division I.

Final round

Quarterfinals

Semifinals

Fifth place game

Bronze medal game

Final

Final standings

Statistics

Scoring leaders 

GP = Games played; G = Goals; A = Assists; Pts = Points; +/− = Plus-minus; PIM = Penalties In MinutesSource:

Goaltending leaders 
(minimum 40% team's total ice time)

TOI = Time on ice (minutes:seconds); GA = Goals against; GAA = Goals against average; Sv% = Save percentage; SO = ShutoutsSource: IIHF.com

Tournament awards
Best players selected by the directorate:
Best Goaltender:  Klara Peslarova
Best Defenceman:  Jincy Dunne
Best Forward:  Taylor Cianfarano
Source:

Division I

Division I "A"
The Division I "A" tournament was played in Füssen, Germany, from 29 March to 4 April 2014.

Division I Qualification
The Division I Qualification tournament was played in Krynica-Zdrój, Poland, from 18 to 23 March 2014.

References

World
IIHF World Women's U18 Championships
2014 in ice hockey
2014 in Hungarian women's sport
International ice hockey competitions hosted by Hungary
March 2014 sports events in Europe
2010s in Budapest
International sports competitions in Budapest